Shady Mohamed Abdel Fattah (born 29 November 1977) is an Egyptian retired professional footballer who played as a centre back.

Honours and achievements

Club
Al Ahly
Egyptian Premier League: 1999–00, 2004–05, 2005–06, 2006–07, 2007–08, 2008–09
CAF Champions League: 2001, 2005, 2006, 2008
CAF Super Cup: 2002, 2006, 2007, 2009
Egypt Cup: 2001, 2003, 2006, 2007
Egyptian Super Cup: 2003, 2005, 2006, 2007, 2008
FIFA Club World Cup third place: 2006

International
Egypt
African Cup of Nations: 2008

References

External links

1977 births
Living people
Egyptian footballers
Egypt international footballers
2008 Africa Cup of Nations players
Al Ahly SC players
Al Ittihad Alexandria Club players
Sportspeople from Alexandria
Egyptian Premier League players
Telephonat Beni Suef SC players
Ismaily SC players
Association football defenders